Ashok Sandhu (born 11 October 2000) is an Indian cricketer. He made his first-class debut for Haryana in the 2016–17 Ranji Trophy on 6 October 2016. He made his List A debut on 25 February 2021, for Haryana in the 2020–21 Vijay Hazare Trophy.

References

External links
 

2000 births
Living people
Indian cricketers
Haryana cricketers
People from Kaithal